The Three Ages of Man (Italian Le tre età dell'uomo) is a painting by Titian, dated between 1512 and 1514, and now displayed at the Scottish National Gallery in Edinburgh. The 90 cm high by 151 cm wide Renaissance art work was most likely influenced by Giorgione's themes and motifs of landscapes and nude figures—Titian was known to have completed some of Giorgione's unfinished works after Giorgione died at age 33 of the plague in 1510. The painting represents the artist's conception of the life cycle. Childhood and manhood are synonymous with earthly love and death approaching old age are drawn realistically. Titian's widely chosen topic in art history, ages of man, mixed with his own allegorical interpretation make The Three Ages of Man one of Titian's most famous works.

History

It was traditionally identified with a painting that Vasari states Titian painted after returning from Ferrara for his stepfather Giovanni di Castel Bolognese at Faenza, dated to 1515. Critics have also dated it slightly earlier, due to the three sleeping putti to the right, evidently modelled on the Tondo of the innocents by Romanino (Musei civici di Padova), which dates to 1513. Several copies of it are known, one of the best of which is that at Rome's Doria Pamphilj Gallery.

After being painted the masterpiece fell into the hands of Matthaus Hopfer. He was known to have a house in the Grottenau filled with 'poetic fable' frescoes.  After his death in 1611 it was passed down to the Ebert family, before being put into the Augsburg market. In 1662 Queen Christina of Sweden passed through the city on her way from the Netherlands to Rome. It was listed in her collection at Palazzo Riario in Rome in 1662. There are no verified records of the next exchange between Giovanni da Castel Bolognese and Otto Truchsess von Waldburg but it is a known fact that, at some point, the painting was in the care of both of their hands. Giovanni, a famous gem-engraver and medallist, was recorded as the next owner. Otto was a leading figure at the Habsburg court and a prominent art patron. Before the painting made its way to the museum it was recorded to have made its final presentation in Giovanni's home in Faenza. Prince Odescalchi gave it to the duke of Orléans in 1722 and it remained in the Orleans Collection until 1798. It was purchased with much of that collection by Francis Egerton, 3rd Duke of Bridgewater, whose descendants later deposited his whole collection with the National Gallery of Scotland for storage and display.

Commentary
The Scottish National Gallery describes the painting as a poetic meditation on the transience of human life and love set in a poetic landscape. At the right Cupid playfully clambers over two sleeping infants. At the left we see young lovers about to embrace. In the middle distance an old man, looking very much like the penitent St. Jerome, is contemplating a pair of skulls - by implication of former lovers. The church in the background may serve to remind viewers of the Christian promise of salvation and eternal life.

Sources

Further reading

 Bertman, Sandra L. "Titian." New York University. 2 June 2001. Web. 4 Mar. 2011
 "The Reformation." Le Poulet Gauche. Web. 05 Mar. 2011
 "Titian. Art and Life." MoodBook. Bring Art to Your Desktop! Web. 05 Mar. 2011
 "Titian and Giorgione: Ethereal Picnic with a Difference." Three Pipe Problem. Web. 10 Mar. 2011
 "Queen Christina of Sweden." History Learning Site. Web. 10 Mar. 2011

1512 paintings
Paintings in the National Galleries of Scotland
Allegorical paintings by Titian
Paintings formerly in the Orleans Collection